The Woman's Crusade (German: Kreuzzug des Weibes) is a 1926 German silent drama film directed by Martin Berger and starring Conrad Veidt, Maly Delschaft, and Harry Liedtke.

The film's sets were designed by the art director Robert A. Dietrich.

Cast
Conrad Veidt as the prosecutor
Maly Delschaft as the teacher
Harry Liedtke as the doctor
Werner Krauss as the idiot
Ernst Hofmann as the modern man
Andja Zimowa as the modern woman
Fritz Alberti as the worker
 as the worker woman
Simone Vaudry as the daughter
Aribert Wäscher as the family doctor
Hedwig Wangel as the woman porter
Philipp Manning as the detective
Iwa Wanja as the maid 
Hilde Gerdt as the flower girl

References

External links

Films of the Weimar Republic
German silent feature films
Films directed by Martin Berger
German black-and-white films
German drama films
1926 drama films
Silent drama films
1920s German films
1920s German-language films